Pashayan is an Armenian surname. Notable people with the surname include:

 Benur Pashayan (1959 - 2019), Armenian Greco-Roman wrestler
 Chip Pashayan (born 1941), American lawyer and politician
 Garabed Pashayan Khan (1864 - 1915), Armenian physician and doctor

Armenian-language surnames